Hotan Prefecture (also known as Gosthana, Gaustana, Godana, Godaniya, Khotan, Hetian, Hotien) is located in the Tarim Basin region of southwestern Xinjiang, China, bordering the Tibet Autonomous Region to the south and Union Territory of Ladakh and Gilgit-Baltistan to the west. The vast majority of the Aksai Chin region which is disputed between China and India is administered as part of Hotan Prefecture. The seat of Hotan Prefecture is Hotan and its largest county by population is Karakax County. The vast majority of the residents of the prefecture are Muslim Uyghurs and live around oases situated between the desolate Taklamakan Desert and Kunlun Mountains.

The region was the center of the ancient Iranian Saka Buddhist Kingdom of Khotan. Later, the region was part of the Kara-Khanid Khanate, followed by the Qara Khitai, Chagatai Khanate, Moghulistan and the Dzungar Khanate, which was conquered by the Qing dynasty of China. Hotan became part of Xinjiang under Qing rule. In the 1930s, the Khotan Emirate declared independence from China. The PLA entered Hotan in 1949.

The prefecture is known for its jade, silk and carpets.

Etymology
The prefecture is named for its seat, Hotan (Khotan, Hetian, Hotien).

The area of Hotan is historically known as Gaustana, Godana or Godaniya, a Sanskrit name meaning "Land of the cows".  In Chinese, the same name is written as Yu-t'ien, pronounced as Gu-dana. It is referred to as Gosthana by local Tibetans, which also means the same in Sanskrit.

History
The Hotan Prefecture region played a major part in the Dungan Revolt (1862–1877).

Tunganistan was an independent administered region in the southern part of Xinjiang from 1934 to 1937. The territory included the oases of the southern Tarim Basin; the centre of the region was Khotan.

On December 22, 1949, PLA forces reached Hotan. In 1950, the area was redesignated as Hotan District.

In 1959, the Chinese character name of Hotan was changed from '' to the homophonous ''.

In 1962, events of the Sino-Indian War occurred in parts of Aksai Chin administered as part of Hotan Prefecture.

In 1971, Hotan was changed from a district to a prefecture.

Between June 1991 and March 1992, there were six attacks with firearms on Han Chinese residents in Hotan Prefecture.

According to a reporter for the Wen Wei Po in Ürümqi, between January and August 2005, authorities had disbanded six "illegal underground" religious schools in Hotan Prefecture and confiscated more than one hundred unauthorized religious books and periodicals as well as 972 audio and video tapes.

In 2016, Kunyu was established within the boundaries of Hotan Prefecture.

In 2020 during the COVID-19 pandemic in mainland China, 171 Uyghur workers from Hotan Prefecture were sent to Changsha, Hunan.

Geography
The vast majority of the residents live around oases situated between the desolate Taklamakan Desert and Kunlun Mountains. To the north, the prefecture borders Aksu Prefecture, to the east Bayingolin Mongol Autonomous Prefecture, to the west Kashgar Prefecture, and to the south, Tibet and the areas disputed between China, India and Pakistan. Aksai Chin includes the southernmost point administered as part of Xinjiang. Most of the prefecture has a cold desert climate.

Administrative divisions

The Hotan Prefecture is divided into one county-level city and seven counties and surrounds Kunyu:

Demographics

According to the analysis of Adrian Zenz, the population growth of Hotan declined significantly between 2015 and 2018.

As of 2015, 2,248,113 (96.7%) of the 2,324,287 residents of the prefecture were Uyghur, 71,233 were Han Chinese (3.1%) and 4,941 were from other ethnic groups.

In 2014, according to a local government employee in the township of Langru in Hotan County, "Islamic beliefs are very strong" in the prefecture.

As of the 2000s, the population of Hotan Prefecture was more than 95% Uyghur.

As of 1999, 96.9% of the population of Hotan (Hetian) Prefecture was Uyghur and 3.1% of the population was Han Chinese.

Residents of Hotan Prefecture commonly speak Uyghur and often do not speak Mandarin Chinese.

Notable persons
 Ismail Amat, former Chairman (Governor) of Xinjiang
 Islam Akhun, con-man
 Juma Tayir, imam of the Id Kah Mosque, murdered by ETIM terrorists
 Kurban Tulum, Member of the Fourth National People's Congress, a symbol of unity between Han people and the Uyghurs
 Ablajan Awut Ayup, a pop singer, songwriter and dancer
 Abdul Haq, militant

Historical maps
Historical English-language maps including modern-day Hotan Prefecture area:

Notes

Footnotes

External links

Hotan Government website 
Hotan Government website 
Silk Road in Photographs > Khotan

 
Prefecture-level divisions of Xinjiang